Artemidoros Aniketos (epithet means "the Invincible") was a king who ruled in the area of Gandhara and Pushkalavati in modern northern Pakistan and Afghanistan.

A son of Maues?
Artemidoros has a Greek name and has traditionally been seen as an Indo-Greek king. His remaining coins generally feature portraits of Artemidoros and Hellenistic deities and are typical of Indo-Greek rulers, but on a coin described by numismatician R. C. Senior, Artemidoros seems to claim to be the son of the Indo-Scythian king Maues. Not only does this coin enable a closer dating of Artemidoros; it also sheds new light on the transient ethnic identities during the decline of the Indo-Greek kingdom.

While Maues was 'Great King of Kings', Artemidoros only styled himself King; it appears as though he ruled only a smaller part of his father's dominions. He was either challenged by or ruled in tandem with other kings such as Menander II, whose coins have been found alongside his, and Apollodotus II.

New evaluation

In a 2009 article however, Bopearachchi disputes the interpretation of the coin according to which Artemidoros would be son of Maues. The analysis of several similar coins in good condition and cleaned-up reveals that the obverse should be read rajatirajasa moasa putrasa ca artemidorosa, the ca (pronounced "cha") meaning "and", which opens the way to a possible translation being "King of kings Maues, and the son of Artemidoros". This would suggest that the son of Artemidoros would have issued coins in the name of his father, recognizing at the same time the suzerainty of Maues. In that case, Artemidoros would have been a regular Indo-Greek king, whose son simply made a transition with the rule of Maues.

Time of rule
Bopearachchi has suggested a date of c. 85-80 BCE, but this was before the appearance of the Maues coin. Senior's dating is wider, c. 100–80 BCE, because Senior has given Maues an earlier date.

Coins
During the 1990s, several new types of Artemidoros' coins appeared, of variable quality. R. C. Senior has suggested that Artemidoros relied mostly on temporary mints, perhaps because he held no major cities. All his coins were Indian bilinguals.

Silver:

Obverse: diademed or helmeted bust of king.
Reverse: Artemis facing left or right, Nike facing left or right, or king on horseback.

Artemis, the eponymous goddess of hunting, is seen using a curved bow, which may have been typical of Scythian tribes and further supports his affiliation with them.

Bronzes:

Artemis / humped bull or Artemis / lion.

See also
 Greco-Bactrian Kingdom
 Seleucid Empire
 Greco-Buddhism
 Indo-Scythians
 Indo-Parthian Kingdom
 Kushan Empire

References

The Shape of Ancient Thought. Comparative studies in Greek and Indian Philosophies by Thomas McEvilley (Allworth Press and the School of Visual Arts, 2002) 
The Greeks in Bactria and India, W. W. Tarn, Cambridge University Press.

External links
Coins of Artemidoros
More Coins of Artemidoros

Indo-Greek kings
1st-century BC people